Spain competed at the 2006 European Athletics Championships in Gothenburg, Sweden, from 713 August 2006.

Medals

Results

Men
Track & road events

Field events

Combined events – Decathlon

Women
Track & road events

Field events

Combined events – Heptathlon

Athletics Championships
2006 European Athletics Championships
Nations at the 2006 European Athletics Championships